The 2004 Derby City Council election took place on 10 June 2004 to elect members of Derby City Council in England. One third of the council was up for election and the council stayed under no overall control.

The results saw the Labour Party gain a seat from the Conservatives but lose one to the Liberal Democrats. They also saw Frank Leeming from the United Kingdom Independence Party win the party's first council seat in Derby, gaining a seat that had formerly been held by independent, Ron Allen, who had died in March. Leeming was expected to hold the balance of power on the council between Labour and a Liberal Democrat/Conservative alliance depending on the outcome of a by-election in July.

After the election, the composition of the council was:
Labour 24
Liberal Democrat 14
Conservative 11
United Kingdom Independence Party 1
Vacant 1

Election result

Ward results

Abbey

Allestree

Alvaston

Arboretum

Blagreaves

Boulton

Chaddesden

Chellaston

Darley

Derwent

Littleover

Mackworth

Mickleover

Normanton

Oakwood

Sinfin

Spondon

References

2004 English local elections
2004
2000s in Derby